Zhanna Germanovna Rozhdestvenskaya (born 23 November 1950 in Rtishchevo, Saratov Oblast, RSFSR, USSR) is a Soviet and Russian pop singer, Honored Artist of the Russian Federation (2011), known performer of Soviet songs in the movie.

Range 4 octave voice.

References

External links
 Жанна Рождественская на сайте popsa.info

1950 births
People from Saratov Oblast
Soviet women singers
Soviet composers
Russian composers
Honored Artists of the Russian Federation
Living people
Soviet women composers
Russian women composers
20th-century Russian women singers
20th-century Russian singers
20th-century women composers